The  (German: , abbreviated as DFG / LFA Strasbourg) is a French-German public secondary school opened in September 2021. It is the fifth DFG / LFA to open and the second of its type in France. Shortly after the opening, the French education minister at the time, Jean-Michel Blanquer visited the school and said that his goal was to have more schools of this type in France.

The school is run by the school authority (académie) of Strasbourg. The LFA Strasbourg replaced its German branch.

History 
The French minister of education Jean-Michel Blanquer announced the opening of the LFA Strasbourg at a French-German ministerial meeting on 25 January 2021. The French director of the other DFG / LFA in France, at Buc near Paris, learned of the Strasbourg LFA on the same day.

Students who wanted to join the LFA Strasbourg in the 2021–22 academic year had to sit an oral and written exam in German in March 2021.

The DFG/LFA Strasbourg was previously the German Section Internationale of the Lycée Vauban and as such, its students entering until the 2020-21 academic year graduate with a French Baccalauréat with German Option Internationale du Baccalauréat (OIB). It is also possible to switch to the Lycée International des Pontonniers in Strasbourg and do the AbiBac. The first Strasbourg students will graduate with the French-German Baccalaureate in 2029.

See also 

 European School of Strasbourg

External links
  at Archi-Wiki.org

References 

German international schools in France
2021 establishments in France
Educational institutions established in 2021
Lycées in Grand Est